Ave Maryam (local parlance: [a'fɛ ma'rɪam]), initially titled Salt Is Leaving the Sea, is a 2018 Indonesian romantic drama film written, directed, and produced by . Made under the sentiment of the lack of non-Muslim films in Indonesia, the film was shot for nine days in 2016, and features a soundtrack by Aimee Saras.

After its premiere at the 2018 Hanoi International Film Festival, Ave Maryam premiered nationally at the Jogja-NETPAC Asian Film Festival on 30 November and was theatrically released on 11 April 2019. It was released on Netflix in September 2020; a version from which 12 minutes of footage were removed was shown theatrically and on Netflix while the uncut version was screened at film festivals. The film received positive reviews; it was praised for its Catholic theme and symbolic elements, but was criticized for being unrealistic. It won three awards and was a candidate for Indonesia's 92nd Academy Awards submission.

Plot 
Maryam, a 40-year-old woman from a Muslim family, is working in an orphanage, where she interacts with people of various religions. In 1980, having become a Catholic, she moves to Ambarawa, Semarang, to work as a religious sister at St. Stanislaus Girisonta Church after meeting seven friendly older sisters and deciding to be their assistant. Romo Martin introduces Maryam to senior nun Sister Monic and monastery manager Mila. Maryam's work involves showering elderly sisters, cleaning, and preparing meals. She is helped by Dinda, a young Muslim who frequently sends milk and food.

One day, the sisters receive the announcement Martin is being replaced with new pastor Yosef—Monic's foster child—until Christmas. Martin had predicted Yosef's presence for a long time. Yosef is set to teach musicianship to the sisters. Yosef's high level of musical ability makes Maryam fall in love with him. Monic warns Yosef about Maryam's attitude but fails to persuade him. Maryam and Yosef become closer despite knowing it is forbidden; at one point, they run naked on a beach and make out. Maryam is guilt-ridden and questions her faith, and despite the sisters' attempts to calm her down, leaves the church upon the sisters' notice. She boards a city-bound train and hallucinates that Yosef is looking at her, tempting her to disembark and miss the train.

Maryam goes to Girisonta's confessional where, unbeknown to her, Yosef is the pastor. Yosef disguises his voice and after hearing her apology, he silently cries with heartbreak. Maryam leaves after the sisters pass by.

Cast 

 Maudy Koesnaedi as Sister Maryam
 Chicco Jerikho as Romo Yosef
 Tutie Kirana as Sister Monic
 Olga Lydia as Sister Mila
 Joko Anwar as Romo Martin
 Nathania Angela as Dinda

Production 

Ave Maryam, which is based upon real-life events, was initially titled Salt is Leaving the Sea (Indonesian: Garam Meninggalkan Lautnya). The title was changed to Ave Maryam, a blend of "Ave Maria" and "Maryam," Maryam being Arabic form of Maria.

Before starting production, the film's crew sent letters seeking approval to related organizations, including the Semarang diocese, realizing the Indonesian public might interpret its theme as sensitive. Director, writer, and producer Ertanto Roby Soediskam said he was ready to face any controversy, saying; "We made the film honestly, so we are ready to bear that risk". Ertanto said he was bored of Indonesian films that consistently feature Muslim themes because Islam is the dominant religion in Indonesia, thus he was making a film about Catholicism. Ertanto hoped the film benefits the audiences in their social and family lives. Additionally, Nathania Angela also stars in her first film role.

After receiving approval, principal photography began in Semarang and Yogyakarta on 26 November, 2016, and ended nine days later. The equipment for the film was borrowed. As a noncommercial project, the crew would not receive any portion of the box office revenue because of the film's goal of "coloring" the cinema of Indonesia. Ertanto insisted the film would not have any form of follow-up. The film's poster and trailer were revealed in late September 2018.

Maudy Koesnaedi initially declined to be part of the film but Ertano persuaded her. Koesnaedi became ill during filming, causing a pause in production. Her husband Erik Meijer permitted her to be involved in the project "if it could cure her sickness" but she was still ill during principal photography. Preparing for her challenging role, Maudy met with senior nuns and observed their daily lives. Maryam is Maudy first major film role. The consensus to cast Maudy was not based purely on religion; Ertanto realized she was Muslim after production; her role in the film led the general public to question her "true religion".

Ave Maryam'''s soundtrack was sung by jazz singer Aimee Saras. The gospel music is titled "Sacred Heart" and is based on the eponymous Catholic devotion. Inspiration for the song came from the music of Lana Del Rey. The Christian hymns "O Holy Night", "Gloria in excelsis Deo", and "How Great Thou Art" are also heard in Ave Maryam.

 Release 
Still using the title Salt is Leaving the Sea (Vietnamese: Muối đang rời xa biển), Ave Maryam premiered at the 2018 Hanoi International Film Festival and also screened at the 2018 Hong Kong Asian Film Festival and the 2018 Cape Town International Film Market & Festival. It also screened at the 4th ASEAN International Film Festival & Awards, where it won in the Best Editing category. It also screened at the CinemAsia Film Festival for two days, the QCinema International Film Festival 2019, and in the Asian Film Festival Barcelona. In April 2019, the 14th Melbourne Indonesian Film Festival (IFF) screened the film alongside Keluarga Cemara, Night Bus, and Turah. Ave Maryam was also screened at Paragon Cineplex, Bangkok, on 6 July 2019 for the Bangkok ASEAN Film Festival. Ave Maryam was first shown in Indonesia at the Jogja-NETPAC Asian Film Festival on 30 November 2018, and later on 14 November 2019 at the Plaza Indonesia Film Festival. It was the closing film for the 2019 Asia Africa Film Festival, for which tickets sold out. The film opened in Indonesia on 11 April 2019 in 39 theaters on the same day as Bumi Itu Bulat and Sunyi. Ave Maryam release had been planned for February. The theatrical "gala premiere" was at Epicentrum XXI in Jakarta on 4 April 2019; there was a meet-and-greet and Q&A session before the film started. Audiences of the film were referred to as saksi cinta Maryam ("witnesses of Maryam's love story"). The film attracted an estimated audience of 42,044 as of 14 April, and 77,000 as of 24 April. If Ave Maryam had been a commercial project, it is estimated it would have garnered Rp. 3.2 billion.

In Indonesia, the Indonesian Film Censorship Board (LSF) distributed two versions of Ave Maryam; a cut, 17+ version and an uncut, 21+ version. The 17+ version was used for theaters while the 21+ version was screened at film festivals. The uncut duration is 85 minutes long while the cut version is 74 minutes long. Many criticized the LSF for cutting important scenes that were deemed explicit rather than blurring them. After a year without information, the LSF-censored version of the film was released on Netflix on 3 September 2020; Netflix received criticism from the general public for choosing the cut version when they would not have any legal problems if they released the uncut version.

 Reception 

Some critics praised Ave Maryam, calling it a significant influence on Indonesian cinema. The film's combination of realism and surrealism was also praised. Media Indonesia Fathurrozak said its theme of religious tolerance  succeeds in "begging for tolerance without ranting vaguely". Critics from Tempo praised the soundtrack as a "lust builder", the cinematography as "poetic yet violent", and the film as a whole for being semiotic. The magazine's Astari Pinasthika Sarosa analyzed the changing of Maryam's clothing palette as the film progresses; the design becomes darker as situations intensify. Ave Maryam has been compared with the films of Wong Kar-wai and the biblical story of Adam and Eve.

CNN Indonesia praised the film's taboo elements, Ical Tanjung's cinematography for capturing Semarang beautifully, and the ending, which the reviewer called  "soul-floating". CNN Philippines' Gil Perez said; "There is not much to say about [it] because not much happens. The film feels like a short film stretched out to an hour and 15 minutes". Perez also wrote the film "goes for a more somber, internal treatment" of its romance theme. Calling it "needlessly melancholic", he doubted many scenes in the film are worthy of inclusion.

Criticism of some elements in the film also arose. Muhammad Reza Fadillah of Ulasinema criticized a scene in which Anwar wears a G-Shock watch that was on sale three years after the film's time setting, which interferes with the time alignment. Student newspaper BPMF Pijar criticized the excessive use of deus ex machina. Stanley Widianto of The Jakarta Post wrote; "Ave Maryam is weak-willed. It's not a thought-provoking movie and it doesn't even masquerade as one. Guilt, because of its cursory treatment, becomes an afterthought when it should have been the crux of the story." Tirto.id was disappointed with the film and said Maryam's introversion makes her "unsympathetic" while CNN Indonesia regretted the lack of portrayal of Maryam's character.

Novita Widia of film review website The Display said the film's ending, the confessional scene, hints at signs of gender disparity in churches; it said in that scene, "[the nuns] clearly didn't hold as much power to get rid of him or belittle [Yosef's] influence at the church. [His] superior position held them back from expressing their anger, disappointment, or worries [...] Putting Father Yosef's flirtatious attempt to Sister Maryam in the first place, this kind of treatment was clearly troubling." The reviewer called the movie "a strong reminder that women's roles in a religious body are often marginalized by the hierarchy system that often dominated and gives advantages to men".

 Accolades 
Along with 27 Steps of May, Ave Maryam was a candidate for the Indonesia entry of the 92nd Academy Awards, but failed to Kucumbu Tubuh Indahku. See also 

 Madame Bovary, a novel featured in the film
Maryam (name)
 Miriam (given name)

Footnotes 

 References 

 External links 

 

 Ave Maryam on Film Indonesia,'' an Indonesian movie database
"Sacred Heart (Original Soundtrack of Ave Maryam The Movie)" at Spotify

2018 drama films
Films set in the 1990s
Films set in Java
Films about Catholicism
2018 romance films
Films shot in Indonesia
Films about clerical celibacy
Indonesian romantic drama films